Adoration of the Christ Child is a painting in tempera and oils of  by Bramantino in the Pinacoteca Ambrosiana, Milan.

Produced for an unknown commissioner from Milan, it shows the Christ Child being adored by the kneeling figures of Bernardino of Siena (recognisable by his grey Franciscan habit), Francis of Assisi (with his stigmata), Benedict of Nursia (in a black Benedictine habit) and the Virgin Mary. Behind them is a group of angel musicians standing on a column base. On the far left and right of the painting are the emperor Augustus and a sibyl in standing poses based on that of the Pothos sculpture. Their presence and that of a Roman arch in the background refer to a passage in the Golden Legend (1.40) in which a sibyl prophesies to Augustus that his Temple of Peace in Rome would crumble the day a virgin gave birth.

References

Paintings by Bramantino
Paintings in the collection of the Pinacoteca Ambrosiana
1485 paintings
Nativity of Jesus in art
Paintings of Francis of Assisi
Paintings of Benedict of Nursia
Paintings of Bernardino of Siena
Cultural depictions of Augustus